is a 1976–77 Toei live action tokusatsu television series in which shadow puppeteer turned salaryman Kageo Sugata (Naoki Tachibana) gains the ability to merge with his shadow and transform into a hero known as Kagestar, thanks to an electric shock received while rescuing his wealthy boss's daughter from kidnappers.

An Evel Knievel-inspired superhero with a swirling star-spangled striped cape he can use like a weapon, Kagestar rides a winged white motorcycle called the KageroCar that he keeps housed in a big and quite bizarre-looking aircraft called the Kagebuse, which he summons with his flashlight gun. He can also bring his shadow to life in giant form to battle the forces of evil.

While Kagestar initially fought costumed crooks patterned after American superhero comics early in the show’s run, in later episodes his foes became Kamen Rider-style mutated monsters created by his archenemy Dr. Satan (Goro Naya), a former Nazi scientist turned megalomaniacal mastermind also identified in some English language sources as Dr. Saturn.

Kagestar is assisted his similarly empowered white-skirted partner Bellestar (Emi Hayakawa), who rides a motorcycle of her own called the BelleCar and has a small bell on her bracelet that rings to warn her of danger.

Cast
 Masao Komatsu
 Akiji Kobayashi

References

External links
 

Tokusatsu television series
1976 Japanese television series debuts
1977 Japanese television series endings
Toei tokusatsu
TV Asahi original programming